The Sault Ste. Marie Greyhounds (often shortened to Soo Greyhounds) are a major junior ice hockey team in the Ontario Hockey League. The Greyhounds play home games at the GFL Memorial Gardens. The present team was founded in 1962 as a team in the Northern Ontario Hockey Association. The Greyhounds name has been used by several ice hockey teams based in Sault Ste. Marie, Ontario, Canada, since 1919.

Early years
The first Greyhounds team formed in 1919, playing in the now defunct Upper-Peninsula League. The team's coach was George McNamara. He suggested the team be called the Greyhounds since, "a greyhound is much faster than a wolf." That reference was to the already established rival club, the Sudbury Wolves.

A couple of seasons later, the Greyhounds switched to the Northern Ontario Hockey Association Senior "A" division. The team won the Senior A championship in 1921, 1923, 1924 and 1925. The 1924 Greyhounds also won the Allan Cup, becoming the only team from Sault Ste. Marie to do so. In October 1925, the club received an offer from New York to play as the Knickerbockers in the Eastern Amateur Hockey League. The Greyhounds joined the Central Amateur Hockey Association, a division of the United States Amateur Hockey Association for the 1925–26 season. After the season, several players joined the professional ranks and the team folded.

In 1929, a junior Greyhounds team was organized, competing in the Northern Ontario Junior Hockey League. The juniors won the league championship four consecutive years from 1928 to 1931, and added a fifth title in 1942. Junior hockey in Sault Ste. Marie came to an abrupt end in 1945, when the Gouin Street Arena was destroyed by fire.

The senior Greyhounds team was revived in 1948. The new team played out of a temporary home at Pullar Stadium, in Sault Sainte Marie, Michigan, U.S.A., until the Memorial Gardens opened in 1949. The senior Greyhounds won the NOHA championship four times, in 1950, 1951, 1952 and 1955. This team folded, along with the league, after the 1958–59 season.

Modern era
The current Greyhounds Junior A franchise was founded in 1962 as a member of the Northern Ontario Junior Hockey League (NOJHL). The team's founders were Angelo Bumbacco, Lloyd Prokop, Phil Suraci, Pat Esposito and Bill Kelly. During the Greyhounds ten seasons in the NOJHL, they never had a losing season, and won the league championship three times. In 1972, the Greyhounds entered the Ontario Hockey Association as a Major Junior A expansion team. The original founders served as directors, joined by Frank Caputo and Frank Sarlo. Angelo Bumbacco died on October 27, 2020, aged 88.

Wayne Gretzky 1977–78
He was still small in stature, but would have a big impact on the game.

Gretzky requested to wear # 9 for his idol Gordie Howe, but that number was already taken by teammate Brian Gualazzi. Gretzky then chose # 14 instead. After a few games, coach Muzz MacPherson suggested wearing two nines would be better than one. From that season on, Gretzky always wore the legendary # 99.

In 63 games that year, he set the Greyhounds all-time record, scoring 70 goals and had 112 assists for a total of 182 points. Gretzky would have won the scoring title, except for a 192-point season by 20-year-old player Bobby Smith. Gretzky was awarded the Emms Family Award as the rookie of the year, and the William Hanley Trophy as most gentlemanly player.

Memorial Cup, 1985
After winning the OHL championship, the Greyhounds travelled to Shawinigan, Quebec to compete in the Memorial Cup tournament, for the national junior hockey title. The Greyhounds played against the host team Shawinigan Cataractes, the QMJHL champion Verdun Junior Canadiens, and the WHL champion Prince Albert Raiders.

The Greyhounds were led by future NHLers, Jeff Beukeboom, Chris Felix, Derek King, Wayne Presley, Bob Probert and Rob Zettler. Leading scorers in the regular season were Wayne Groulx, Graeme Bonar and Sault Ste. Marie native Mike Oliverio.

The Greyhounds won the first game on May 11 in Shawinigan versus the home team, by a score 4-3, in front of 3,276 fans. Televising games from the Aréna Jacques Plante in Shawinigan proved difficult due to roof support pillars around the ice surface. After two games in Shawinigan, the remainder of the tournament was played in the Centre Marcel Dionne in Drummondville, Quebec.

The Greyhounds won their first game in Drummondville 6-3 over Verdun, with two goals from Derek King. Their first loss of the tournament came in game three, losing 8-6 to the Prince Albert Raiders. With the loss, the Cataractes, Raiders and Greyhounds would all finish the round-robin with two wins and a loss. Shawinigan earned a spot in the finals on best goals for and against difference, with Sault Ste. Marie and Prince Albert to have a rematch in the semi-final game. On May 16, the Greyhounds lost again to the Raiders.

Memorial Cup, 1991
The Greyhounds season of 1990–91 marked an incredible turnaround from seventh place the season before, to finishing first place and winning the Emms division. General manager Sherwood Bassin put together pieces for coach Ted Nolan to win. Bassin was awarded Bill Long Award for distinguished service to the OHL, was named both the OHL Executive of the Year, and the CHL Executive of the Year in 1991.
 
The Greyhounds swept both playoff series and earned a second round bye to reach the OHL finals against the defending champions, the Oshawa Generals. The J. Ross Robertson Cup finals had many subplots due to the big trade between the clubs in the previous season. Added to the mix was Joe Busillo, an overager picked up from Oshawa, who won the Memorial Cup with the Generals the previous year. Fans from the Soo were still very bitter towards Oshawa captain Eric Lindros, who had originally been drafted by the Greyhounds in 1989 but chose not to play for them (eventually being traded to the Generals). The Soo crowd loudly jeered Lindros every time he was on the ice during the championship series. The Greyhounds upset the heavily favoured defending champions in a six-game series, winning the last game on home ice.

The Greyhounds were led in scoring by Colin Miller, Tony Iob, Trevor Koopmans, and future NHLers Adam Foote and tough guys Bob Boughner, and Denny Lambert. Other members to move onto the NHL included Drew Bannister, Ralph Intranuovo, Brad Tiley and goaltenders Kevin Hodson and Mike Lenarduzzi.

The 1991 Memorial Cup was hosted by the QMJHL in Quebec City at the Colisée de Québec. Their opponents would be the WHL champion Spokane Chiefs, and the QMJHL finalists Drummondville Voltigeurs and the champion Chicoutimi Saguenéens. The Greyhounds did not win a game in the tournament, but gained valuable experience for next season.

Memorial Cup, 1992
The 1991–92 Greyhounds repeated as winners of the Emms division. Sault Ste. Marie earned a first round bye in the playoffs, then defeated the Kitchener Rangers and Niagara Falls Thunder to return to the league finals. The Greyhounds won their third J. Ross Robertson Cup by defeating their northern counterparts, the North Bay Centennials in a seven-game series.

The Greyhounds were led by captain Rick Kowalsky, and in scoring by Jarrett Reid's 53 goals and also had two players with 100 point seasons, Colin Miller and Ralph Intranuovo. The Soo also gained a midseason boost and more toughness, acquiring future NHLer Chris Simon in a trade with the Ottawa 67's.

The 1992 Memorial Cup was hosted by the WHL in Seattle, Washington at the Seattle Center Coliseum. Their opponents would be the WHL champion Kamloops Blazers, the QMJHL champion Verdun Collège Français, and the host Seattle Thunderbirds.

The Greyhounds reversed their fortunes of the previous Memorial Cup, winning all three games of the round-robin, advancing directly to the tournament finals. Their opponent in the finals would be the Kamloops Blazers. The Greyhounds came back from an early 3-0 deficit 15 minutes into the game to tie the score at 3-3. Kamloops scored early in the third period for a 4-3 lead. Chris Simon then tied the game for Sault Ste. Marie with four minutes remaining to play. The game looked to be headed for overtime, until Kamloops' Zac Boyer scored on a breakaway with 14.6 seconds remaining to seal the victory for the Blazers.

Memorial Cup, 1993
In the 1992–93, the Greyhounds won their third consecutive Emms division title. They narrowly beat out the Detroit Junior Red Wings by having more wins in the regular season despite both teams earning 81 points. The OHL revived the idea of a Super Series from six years previous to determine which team would host the Memorial Cup of 1993. The Greyhounds assured themselves of a third consecutive trip to the Memorial Cup, by sweeping the series versus the Leyden division champion Peterborough Petes. Jarret Reid led Sault Ste. Marie in scoring through the playoffs, with 19 goals and 16 assists in 18 games.

After the Super Series ended, the regular playoffs started. Sault Ste. Marie earned the first round bye, then defeated the Owen Sound Platers and the Junior Red Wings to reach the finals against the Petes. This time, the Petes prevailed 4 games to 1, spoiling the Greyhounds chances of a third consecutive J. Ross Robertson Cup. Joining the Greyhounds and Petes in the Memorial Cup would be the WHL champion Swift Current Broncos and the QMJHL champion Laval Titan.

The Greyhounds and the Petes both finished the Memorial Cup round-robin with two wins and a loss. Sault Ste. Marie earned a berth in the finals by having beaten the Petes in the round robin. The two teams would meet again in the tournament finals, playing in front a hometown crowd of 4,757 spectators at the Memorial Gardens on May 23. Sault Ste. Marie led 3-0 after the first period, and held on to win their first Memorial Championship, beating the Petes 4-2. The victory party continued on Queen St. late into the evening.

Recent years
The Greyhounds followed up their Memorial Cup winning season with a strong 1993–94 campaign finishing second place in the division. The Soo reached the semi-finals, but lost to the Junior Red Wings in six games. After the season, coach Ted Nolan departed for the Hartford Whalers.

The following 1994–95 season, the Greyhounds finished last place in the league during a rebuilding season. In attempt to generate more sales, the Greyhounds redesigned their logo. It proved to be unpopular with the fans, and the team discontinued its use after the 1998–99 season, and went back to the classic logo.

Centre Joe Thornton was the 1995–96 OHL rookie of the year and was the first player in the history of the franchise to be drafted first overall in the NHL Entry Draft. He was selected by the Boston Bruins.

In the 2001–02 season, former Greyhound defenceman Craig Hartsburg took over as head coach after coaching stints in the NHL. Hartsburg was named the OHL coach of the year that season, then left the team to join the coaching staff of the Philadelphia Flyers.

Replacing Hartsburg was former Greyhound netminder, and part-owner of the team, John Vanbiesbrouck. Vanbiesbrouck was forced to resign as coach during the season as a result of racist comments he had made about team captain, Trevor Daley. Hartsburg returned as coach midway through the 2004–05 season.

After playing at the Sault Memorial Gardens from 1962 to 2006, the Greyhounds moved into their new home, the Steelback Centre, for the 2006–07 season. In June 2008, the arena was renamed The Essar Centre, following the purchase of naming rights by Essar Steel Algoma.

In the 2007–08 OHL season, the Greyhounds had their best regular season since 1985, going 44–18–2–4, with a long undefeated streak to begin the year. The Greyhounds also had their longest post season run since 1994, making it to the conference finals before losing to the Kitchener Rangers in five games.

In the 2008–09 season, assistant coach Denny Lambert assumed head coaching duties after Craig Hartsburg left to become head coach of the NHL's Ottawa Senators. Assistant coach Toots Kovacs also left the team and was replaced by Mike Stapleton and Nick Warriner. The Greyhounds missed the playoffs for the first time since 2004.

After several trades in the organization have shown a shift to rebuilding the team, Dave Torrie (General Manager), took over head coaching duties with the firing of Denny Lambert in January 2011. Later that same year Dave Torrie was also relieved of his duties and replaced with Kyle Dubas as general manager. The fans also welcomed back Mike Stapleton as new Head Coach for next season, but was fired and replaced on December 3, 2012 by Sheldon Keefe.

After the 2014–15 OHL season, the Greyhounds had taken the Hamilton Spectator Trophy while setting a franchise record in regular season points. During the 2015 playoffs, the Greyhounds had their run ended by Connor McDavid and the Erie Otters in the Western Conference Finals. After one of the teams best seasons, head coach Sheldon Keefe had signed with the Toronto Marlies of the AHL.

On July 10, 2015, Drew Bannister was named head coach of the Greyhounds. He would leave after the 2017–18 season to become the head coach of the San Antonio Rampage in the AHL. Bannister had led the Hounds to an overall 136–50–13–5 record, two West Division titles, and was named OHL and CHL coach of the year in 2018.

Championships
While in the Northern Ontario Junior Hockey League, the Greyhounds won the McNamara Trophy as playoff champions in 1967, 1970, and 1972. The Greyhounds were also regular season champions six times and playoff finalists 4 times.

The Greyhounds also joined the Oshawa Generals and Peterborough Petes as the only OHL teams to make three consecutive appearances in the Memorial Cup. Since joining the OHL, Sault Ste. Marie has won a total of 8 division titles, five Hamilton Spectator Trophy titles, three J. Ross Robertson Cup titles, and one Memorial Cup title.

Division Trophies
 1980–81 - Leyden Division
 1982–83 - Emms Division
 1984–85 - Emms Division
 1990–91 - Emms Division
 1991–92 - Emms Division
 1992–93 - Emms Division
 1996–97 - West Division
 2004–05 - West Division
 2007–08 - West Division
 2013–14 - West Division
 2014-15  - West Division
 2016-17 - West Division
 2017-18 - West Division
Hamilton Spectator Trophy
 1980–81 - 47 Wins, 2 Ties, 96 points
 1982–83 - 48 Wins, 1 Tie, 97 points
 1984–85 - 54 Wins, 1 Tie, 109 points
 2014-15 - 54 W, 12 L, 0 OTL, 2 SL, 110 points
 2017-18 - 55 W, 7 L, 3 OTL, 3 SL, 116 points
Wayne Gretzky Trophy
 2000 Lost to the Plymouth Whalers
 2008 Lost to the Kitchener Rangers
 2015 Lost to the Erie Otters
 2018 Champions vs. the Kitchener Rangers
J. Ross Robertson Cup
 1981 Lost to the Kitchener Rangers
 1983 Lost to the Oshawa Generals
 1985 Champions vs. the Peterborough Petes
 1991 Champions vs. the Oshawa Generals
 1992 Champions vs. the North Bay Centennials
 1993 Lost to the Peterborough Petes
 2018 Lost to the Hamilton Bulldogs

Memorial Cup
 1985 3rd place in Drummondville, Québec
 1991 4th place in Québec City, Québec
 1992 Finalists vs. the Kamloops Blazers
 1993 Champions vs. the Peterborough Petes

Coaches
Terry Crisp was twice voted the OHL Coach of the Year, winning the Matt Leyden Trophy in 1982-83 and 1984-85. Craig Hartsburg won the award in 2001-02. Most recently Drew Bannister won the award in 2017-18.

List of coaches with multiple seasons in parentheses.

Players
Since Sault Ste. Marie joined the OHA in 1972, the Greyhounds have sent 77 alumni onto play in the NHL. Three of those (Paul Coffey, Ron Francis and Wayne Gretzky) have been inducted into the Hockey Hall of Fame.

First round NHL entry draft picks
 2013 - Darnell Nurse, 1st round, (7th overall) Edmonton Oilers
 2014 - Jared McCann, 1st round, (24th overall) Vancouver Canucks
 2015 - Zachary Senyshyn, 1st round (15th overall) Boston Bruins
 2017 - Morgan Frost, 1st round (27th overall) Philadelphia Flyers
 2018 - Barrett Hayton, 1st round (5th overall) Arizona Coyotes; Rasmus Sandin, 1st Round (29th overall) Toronto Maple Leafs

Retired numbers
 # 1 - John Vanbiesbrouck
 # 4 - Craig Hartsburg
 # 5 - Adam Foote
 # 10 - Ron Francis
 # 99 - Wayne Gretzky

Award winners

CHL Rookie of the Year
 1995–96 - Joe Thornton

CHL Top Draft Prospect Award
 1996–97 - Joe Thornton

CHL Goaltender of the Year
 2001–02 - Ray Emery

Red Tilson Trophy Most Outstanding Player
 1973–74 - Jack Valiquette
 1984–85 - Wayne Groulx

Eddie Powers Memorial Trophy Scoring Champion
 1973–74 - Jack Valiquette (tied)
 1975–76 - Mike Kaszycki
 1980–81 - John Goodwin

Jim Mahon Memorial Trophy Top Scoring Right Winger
 1996–97 - Joe Seroski

Max Kaminsky Trophy Most Outstanding Defenceman
 1976–77 - Craig Hartsburg
 2009-10 - Jake Muzzin
 2012-13 - Ryan Sproul
 2014-15 - Anthony DeAngelo

OHL Goaltender of the Year
 2001–02 - Ray Emery

Jack Ferguson Award First Overall Draft Pick
 1986 - Troy Mallette
 1989 - Eric Lindros
 2009 - Daniel Catenacci

Dave Pinkney Trophy Lowest Team GAA
 1981–82 - Marc D'Amour & John Vanbiesbrouck
 1984–85 - Scott Mosey & Marty Abrams
 1990–91 - Mike Lenarduzzi & Kevin Hodson
 1991–92 - Kevin Hodson

Emms Family Award Rookie of the Year
 1973–74 - Jack Valiquette
 1975–76 - John Tavella
 1977–78 - Wayne Gretzky
 1978–79 - John Goodwin
 1984–85 - Derek King
 1995–96 - Joe Thornton

F.W. "Dinty" Moore Trophy Best Rookie GAA
 1980–81 - John Vanbiesbrouck
 1983–84 - Gerry Iuliano
 1990–91 - Kevin Hodson

William Hanley Trophy Most Sportsmanlike Player
 1977–78 - Wayne Gretzky
 1980–81 - John Goodwin

Hockey Hall of Fame members
There are six members of the Hockey Hall of Fame that have played for a team known as the Sault Ste. Marie Greyhounds. Bill Cook and Bun Cook played for the Greyhounds of the Northern Ontario Hockey Association (NOHA) between 1921–1925. Bill Cook was inducted in 1952, while Bun wasn't inducted until 1995 in the defunct Veteran category. Tony Esposito played for the Greyhounds of the Northern Ontario Junior Hockey League (NOJHL) during the 1962–63 season, and was inducted into the Hall in 1988.

The current junior Greyhounds have three alumni inducted into Hockey Hall of Fame. They are Wayne Gretzky, Paul Coffey and Ron Francis, who were respectively inducted in 1999, 2004 and 2007 respectively.

NHL alumni
 1919 to 1945, 1949 to 1958 (NOHA )

 1962 to 1972 (NOJHL )

 1972 to present (OHA / OMJHL / OHL)

Yearly results

Regular season
 1962 to 1972 in the NOJHL
 1972 to 1974 in the OHA
 1974 to 1980 in the OMJHL
 1980 to present in the OHL

Legend: OTL = Overtime loss, SL = Shootout loss

Playoffs
1962–63 Lost in semi-finals.
1963–64 Lost in finals.
1964–65 Lost in semi-finals.
1965–66 Lost in finals.
1966–67 McNamara Trophy Champions.
1967–68 Lost in semi-finals.
1968–69 Lost in finals.
1969–70 McNamara Trophy Champions.
1970–71 Lost in finals.
1971–72 McNamara Trophy Champions.
1972–73 Out of playoffs.
1973–74 Out of playoffs.
1974–75 Out of playoffs.
1975–76 Defeated Oshawa Generals 6 points to 4 in first round. Lost to Sudbury Wolves 9 points to 5 in quarter-finals.
1976–77 Defeated Peterborough Petes 3 games to 1 in first round. Lost to Ottawa 67's 4 games to 0, 1 tie in quarter-finals.
1977–78 Defeated Kingston Canadiens 6 points to 4 in first round. Lost to Ottawa 67's 9 points to 7 in quarter-finals.
1978–79 Out of playoffs.
1979–80 Out of playoffs.
1980–81 Defeated Oshawa Generals 8 points to 4 in division semi-finals. Defeated Kingston Canadians 9points to 5 in division finals. Lost to Kitchener Rangers 9 points to 3 in finals.
1981–82 Earned bye through first round. 2nd place in Emms. Defeated Brantford Alexanders 8 points to 6 in quarter-finals. Lost to Kitchener Rangers 9 points to 3 in semi-finals.
1982–83 Earned bye through first round. 1st place in Emms. Defeated Brantford Alexanders 8 points to 2 in quarter-finals. Defeated Kitchener Rangers 8 points to 2 in semi-finals. Lost to Oshawa Generals 9 points to 5 in finals.
1983–84 Defeated Windsor Spitfires 6 points to 0 in first round. Defeated Brantford Alexanders 8 points to 4 in quarter-finals. Lost to Kitchener Rangers 8 points to 6 in semi-finals.
1984–85 Defeated Kitchener Rangers 8 points to 0 in first round. Earned bye through quarter-finals. 1st place in Emms. Defeated Hamilton Steelhawks 9 points to 1 in semi-finals. Defeated Peterborough Petes 9 points to 5 in finals. OHL CHAMPIONS Finished Memorial Cup round robin tied for second place. Lost to Prince Albert Raiders 8-3 in semi-final game.
1985–86 Out of playoffs.
1986–87 Lost to Windsor Spitfires 4 games to 0 in first round.
1987–88 Lost to London Knights 4 games to 2 in first round.
1988–89 Out of playoffs.
1989–90 Out of playoffs.
1990–91 Defeated Dukes of Hamilton 4 games to 0 in first round. Earned bye through quarter-finals. 1st place in Emms. Defeated Niagara Falls Thunder 4 games to 0 in semi-finals. Defeated Oshawa Generals 4 games to 2 in finals. OHL CHAMPIONS Finished Memorial Cup round robin in 4th place.
1991–92 Earned bye through first round. 1st place in Emms. Defeated Kitchener Rangers 4 games to 3 in quarter-finals. Defeated Niagara Falls Thunder 4 games to 1 in semi-finals. Defeated North Bay Centennials 4 games to 3 in finals. OHL CHAMPIONS Finished Memorial Cup round robin in 1st place, earning berth in finals. Lost to Kamloops Blazers 5-4 in championship game.
1992–93 Defeated Peterborough Petes 4 games to 0 in super-series for right to host Memorial Cup. Earned bye through first round. 1st place in Emms. Defeated Owen Sound Platers 4 games to 0 in quarter-finals. Defeated Detroit Jr. Red Wings 4 games to 1 in semi-finals. Lost to Peterborough Petes 4 games to 1 in finals. Finished Memorial Cup round robin in 1st place, earning berth in finals. Defeated Peterborough Petes 4-2 in championship game. MEMORIAL CUP CHAMPIONS
1993–94 Defeated Windsor Spitfires 4 games to 0 in division quarter-finals. Defeated Guelph Storm 4 games to 0 in division semi-finals. Lost to Detroit Jr. Red Wings 4 games to 2 in semi-finals.
1994–95 Out of playoffs.
1995–96 Lost to Sarnia Sting 4 games to 0 in division quarter-finals.
1996–97 Defeated Detroit Whalers 4 games to 1 in division quarter-finals. Lost to Guelph Storm 4 games to 2 in quarter-finals.
1997–98 Out of playoffs.
1998–99 Lost to Owen Sound Platers 4 games to 1 in conference quarter-finals.
1999–2000 Defeated Kitchener Rangers 4 games to 1 in conference quarter-finals. Defeated Erie Otters 4 games to 3 in conference semi-finals. Lost to Plymouth Whalers 4 games to 1 in conference finals.
2000–01 Out of playoffs.
2001–02 Lost to Windsor Spitfires 4 games to 2 in conference quarter-finals.
2002–03 Lost to Kitchener Rangers 4 games to 0 in conference quarter-finals.
2003–04 Out of playoffs.
2004–05 Lost to Windsor Spitfires 4 games to 3 in conference quarter-finals.
2005–06 Lost to London Knights 4 games to 0 in conference quarter-finals.
2006–07 Defeated Saginaw Spirit 4 games to 2 in conference quarter-finals. Lost to London Knights 4 games to 3 in conference semi-finals.
2007–08 Defeated Saginaw Spirit 4 games to 0 in conference quarter-finals. Defeated Guelph Storm 4 games to 1 in conference semi-finals. Lost to Kitchener Rangers 4 games to 1 in conference finals.
2008–09 Out of playoffs.
2009–10 Lost to Plymouth Whalers 4 games to 1 in conference quarter-finals.
2010–11 Out of playoffs.
2011–12 Out of playoffs.
2012–13 Lost to Owen Sound Attack 4 games to 2 in conference quarter-finals.
2013–14 Defeated Owen Sound Attack 4 games to 1 in conference quarter-finals. Lost to Erie Otters 4 games to 0 in conference semi-finals.
2014–15 Defeated Saginaw Spirit 4 games to 0 in conference quarter-finals. Defeated Guelph Storm 4 games to 0 in conference semi-finals. Lost to Erie Otters 4 games to 2 in conference finals.
2015-16 Defeated Sarnia Sting 4 games to 3 in conference quarter-finals. Lost to Erie Otters 4 games to 1 in conference semi-finals.
2016-17 Defeated Flint Firebirds 4 games to 1 in conference quarter-finals.  Lost to Owen Sound Attack 4 games to 2 in conference semi-finals.
2017-18 Defeated Saginaw Spirit 4 games to 0 in conference quarter-finals.  Defeated Owen Sound Attack 4 games to 3 in conference semi-finals.  Defeated Kitchener Rangers 4 games to 3 in conference finals.  Lost to Hamilton Bulldogs 4 games to 2 in finals.
2018-19 Defeated Owen Sound Attack 4 games to 1 in conference quarter-finals.  Lost to Saginaw Spirit 4 games to 2 in conference semi-finals.
2019–20 Out of playoffs.
2020–21 Cancelled.
2021-22 Defeated Guelph Storm 4 games to 1 in conference quarter-finals.  Lost to Flint Firebirds 4 games to 1 in conference semi-finals.

Uniforms and logos

The Greyhounds colours are predominantly red and white, with uniforms in a style very similar to the Detroit Red Wings. Black and silver trim were added in the late 1980s, as well as four stars above the logo. Sault Ste. Marie has used their classic red circle logo with the running greyhound for all but three seasons of their existence.

From 1996 to 1999 the Greyhounds redesigned their logo (inset right), to what became known by fans as the "Ugly Dog" or "Snoopy" logo. Due to public backlash and a fan petition for its removal, the team discontinued its use and went back to the classic logo. For the 2009-10 switchover to the Reebok Edge jersey system, the Greyhounds returned to their classic jerseys from the 1970s and early 80s, including removing black & silver from their logo. In 2013, the team switched to jerseys identical to those of the NHL's Detroit Red Wings.

The Greyhounds have used third jerseys since 2006, when the team introduced a black third jersey with a "Soo Greyhounds" script logo, as well as red, white, and grey trim, and stars around the waist. The jersey was slightly updated for its 2010 return after the Reebok Edge switchover, but was completely replaced in 2013 in favour of a simpler red third jersey with the running greyhound as the main logo, and a white nameplate with red lettering.

Arenas

The first home of the Greyhounds from 1919 to 1945 was Gouin Street Arena. The arena had wooden benches for 1,000 spectators. It was destroyed by fire in 1945. An outdoor rink at Pullar Stadium in Sault Ste. Marie, Michigan was used until a new indoor facility was built. The Greyhounds returned to Sault Ste. Marie, Michigan again in 1979, playing for about a month at Taffy Abel Arena on the campus of Lake Superior State University due to emergency roof repairs at the Gardens.

The Greyhounds played home games at the Sault Memorial Gardens from 1949 to 2006. The building was named for the war veterans of World War II. The Gardens hosted Memorial Cup games in 1978 and 1993, and the OHL All-Star Game in 1979. The last game at the Gardens was played on Tuesday, March 28, 2006. Demolition of the Gardens began on April 27, 2006. All that remains of the Gardens is the Memorial Tower, which is part of "Memorial Square". The red beacon of the Memorial Tower was preserved and continues to be lit on game days.

The Greyhounds moved to the new GFL Memorial Gardens (formerly named the Steelback Centre and the Essar Centre) for the 2006–07 OHL season. The new arena was built in the east parking lot of the Memorial Gardens, and is the largest such centre in Northern Ontario. Its naming rights are currently held by GFL Environmental. The inaugural game was played on October 11, 2006, resulting in a 2-1 loss to the Sudbury Wolves. The 2008 OHL All-Star Classic was held at the Essar Centre during the 2007–08 season.

Media
Since the 2009–10 season, Greyhounds' games have been broadcast on the radio by Rock 101 in neighbouring Sault Ste. Marie, Michigan, after previously airing on Q104 and CKCY. Most regular season and playoff games for the Greyhounds are broadcast on Shaw Spotlight in Sault Ste. Marie.

See also
List of ice hockey teams in Ontario

References

External links
 

Ontario Hockey League teams
Sport in Sault Ste. Marie, Ontario
Ice hockey clubs established in 1962
1962 establishments in Ontario